Dominican International School, formerly Dominican School, is a private Catholic international school, located in Dazhi, Zhongshan District, Taipei City, Taiwan. The Sisters of the Congregation of the Religious Missionaries of St. Dominic OP own and manage the school. 

The school is open to all foreign students. Dominican International School educates students from Kindergarten to Grade 12, including Advanced Placement.

History

Founding 
In the latter part of 1956, permission from the Mother General of the Sisters was obtained to start a school that offered Catholic instruction and good education to American dependents. The first school was organized for Pre-Kindergarten, Kindergarten and Grades 1 and 2 at a small rented house on Chang'an East Road.

In January 1957, the school was blessed by Anthony Riberi, D.D., Apostolic Internuncio, to China. Three Filipino Sisters started to teach the 16 enrolled children. Enrollment increased steadily, and by June 1957, there were 76 students, and two additional Filipino Sisters had joined the faculty.

In the following school year, a larger house was rented on Liung Chung Street. In August 1958, a team of American Superintendents of Schools from Washington D.C. arrived. They examined the teaching qualifications of the Sisters, the curriculum, methodology and the textbooks used by the students. The American educators agreed unanimously to grant recognition to the efforts of the Sisters and declared that they were able to provide an excellent education to the American dependents. Dominican School became a U.S. Government contract school: a D.O.D. school. Grade 3 was added to the existing grades.

In 1959, a larger building was rented. Three more grades were added and more Sisters arrived from the Philippines. The first PTA was organized with volunteer officers. A vacant site was purchased for the erection of school buildings, including strips of land for granting access to the property. This remains the location of Dominican International School. Before materials could be brought in for the construction of the building, the access roads had to be completed.

The first cornerstone was blessed in a simple ceremony by a Dominican priest on August 4, 1959, after which construction started. On March 28, 1960, classes were held for the first time in the new school. On April 30, 1960, Thomas Cardinal Tien, S.V.D., D.D, blessed the school. Grades 7 and 8 were added in the following year. More Sisters came from the Philippines and the enrollment reached 600.

As time went by, a gymnasium was added, statues erected and a wall placed around the compound. In August 1960, 4 classrooms, a laboratory, a science room, a typing room and a music room were added to the existing school building. For the first time, there were Grade 9 classes and the enrollment reached 800. With the withdrawal of the American Forces from Taipei, Dominican School became an international school.

Twenty-first century 
2006 was spent developing an electronic curriculum. This new system made the curriculum available online to all stakeholders. The initial stages of the development process were completed in time for the school's 50th Year Celebrations in 2007.

In December 2008, the gymnasium, cafeteria, and the west wing of the main building were demolished to make way for the construction of new school buildings more suitable for modern education and technology. The groundbreaking ceremony for the new construction was held in June 2009, blessed by Archbishop John Hung, S.V.D. and construction started in August 2010. Phase One, which included classrooms, an audio-visual room, an art room, science laboratories, and a brand new library were completed in the summer of 2013. State-of-the-art technology was installed. The remaining buildings will be demolished and rebuilt in 2014 and 2015.

Academics 
The modified American curriculum includes courses in Religious Studies.

The teaching faculty of the school represent many nations from four continents. Many faculty boast Master's degrees or PhD's. 

In 2017 the school received accreditation from the United States.

Extracurriculars 
Students at DIS participate in many international events such as an annual Global Issues Network Conference (Manila in February 2012, Singapore in November 2012, Beijing in November 2013, and Jakarta in February 2014). 

In January 2013 four Grade 12 girls and two Grade 9 boys went to an International Peace Conference 

Students participate in the World Scholar’s Cup competition. They represented DIS with success in Shanghai (2010), Kuala Lumpur (2011), Bangkok (2012), and Dubai (2013).

Athletics 
Upper School sports teams and groups, whose mascot is the Wolves, compete with members of the Taiwan International School Sports Association (TISSA), as well as local international and Taiwanese schools.

Varsity teams include basketball, volleyball, soccer, track and field, tennis, swimming, ultimate Frisbee, badminton, and cross country.

DIS participates in competitive sports with the following international schools in Taiwan:

 American School Taichung (AST)
 Grace Christian Academy (GCA)
 Ivy Collegiate Academy (ICA)
 I-Shou International School (IIS)
 Kaohsiung American School (KAS)
 Kuei Shan School (KSS)
 Morrison Academy Taichung (MAT)
 Morrison Academy Kaohsiung (MAK)
 Morrison Academy Taipei (MAT)
 Taipei European School (TES)
 Taipei American School (Non TISSA Member)

Notable alumni

 Peter Ho  (何潤東) actor
 Gregorio Honasan
 Will Pan  (潘瑋柏)  pop singer
 Vanness Wu  (吳建豪) F4, singer, actor
 Norodom Arunrasmy

References

External links

1957 establishments in Taiwan
Dominican schools in Taiwan
Educational institutions established in 1957
International schools in Taipei
Primary schools in Taiwan
High schools in Taiwan